Vlado Maleski (5 September 1919 – Struga, 23 September 1984) was a Yugoslav Macedonian writer, communist activist, publisher and revolutionary. He published several novels and short stories, was the author of the Macedonian national anthem "Denes nad Makedonija", and the script for the first Macedonian movie, "Frosina". For his extensive contributions to the country's literature, Maleski is regarded as part of "the first generation of Macedonian prose writers".

Biography 

Maleski completed his elementary schooling in Shkodra, Albania, and his secondary schooling in Bitola. He enrolled in the University of Belgrade's Law School but did not finish his studies because of the Second World War. During the war, he was an active participant in the National Liberation War of Macedonia. After the war, he became one of the most prominent writers in contemporary Macedonian. Soon after, Maleski became a director of Radio Skopje. He sat on the editorial board of the first Macedonian publishing house. Maleski was also part of the Commission for Language and Orthography that submitted recommendations to the government on standardizing the Macedonian alphabet, which were subsequently accepted.

During his professional life, Maleski was ambassador to Lebanon, Ethiopia, and Poland and was a member of the Presidency of the Socialist Republic of Macedonia. In 1946 he became a full member of the Association of Writers of Macedonia. He was the editor of the literary magazines "Sovremenost" and "Razgledi".

Maleski received the following awards: "11 October", "4 July" and "AVNOJ".

Works 
 Ǵurǵina alova (stories, 1950)
 Branuvanja (stories, 1953)
 Ona što beše nebo (novel, 1958)
 Vojnata, luǵeto, vojnata (novel, 1967)
 Razboj (novel, 1969)
 Razgledi (articles, critics, 1976)
 Kažuvanja (stories, 1976)
 Zapisi na Ezerko Drimski (novel, 1980)
 Jazli (novel, 1990)

References

External links 
 Short biography in English
 Vlado Maleski at the site of the Association of Writers of Macedonia

Macedonian writers
People from Struga
Yugoslav writers
20th-century male writers
Yugoslav diplomats
1919 births
1984 deaths
League of Communists of Macedonia politicians
University of Belgrade Faculty of Law alumni
National anthem writers